Promalactis flavescens is a moth of the family Oecophoridae. It is found in Shaanxi and Sichuan provinces of China.

The wingspan is about 12.5–14 mm.

References

Moths described in 1997
Oecophorinae